Good Game: Spawn Point (abbreviated as Good Game SP or GG:SP, or known simply as Spawn Point), is an Australian video game review programme. 

It is a spin-off (also described as a "sister program") of the original Good Game that only carries reviews of games ACB-rated as G or PG, and professes to be "For young gamers, by gamers". It debuted on ABC Me on 20 February 2010. 

Good Game Spawn Point is now the highest rated show broadcast on ABC ME. Spawn Point was hosted by Steven "Bajo" O'Donnell and Stephanie "Hex" Bendixsen from 2010 to 2016, when the latter departed; the former departed the following year. The show has been hosted by various others, such as Gus "Goose" Ronald from 2017 to 2018, Angharad "Rad" Yeo from 2017 to 2022, William "Will" Yates from 2019 to 2020, and "Jax" in 2022. The current host is Gemma "Gem" Driscoll, who joined in 2018.

Production

Spawn Point began in 2010, hosted by Steven O'Donnell and Stephanie Bendixsen. The ABC has described Good Game: Spawn Point as "featur[ing] a family friendly mix of gamer reviews, stories about gaming culture and plenty of audience interaction". PlayStrat said, "The standard Good Game edition is a more adult oriented series—which includes reviews of games that fall into more mature classifications (i.e. they include violence, sexual content, profanity). It's good, therefore, that the show has the Spawn Point variant to allow the younger crowd to get their fill as well".

The show originally ran for 15 minutes, but was extended to 30 minutes per episode from Series 2, Episode 21 on 2 July 2011. O'Donnell said, "The 30-minute show will allow us to review more games, produce more stories about game culture and delve deeper into gaming's rich history". Creator and executive producer Janet Carr said Spawn Point "is achieving a total TV share of 16.2% among children 5–12 years old and its average audience share is up 114% on series one. Series two has been extended due to the enormous response from the audience and it will give gamers more ways to interact with the show and make it their own". In 2011, Good Game: Spawn Point reached 166,000 viewers per episode.

As the show is "for younger gamers", it is not suitable to review games rated M, MA15+ or R18+. Bendixsen said "occasionally we might give you a glimpse of a mature title but only where it's necessary to make a point", and adds that the contentious content would always be excluded. On 1 July 2011, TV Tonight said "Together with ABC2's Good Game, Good Game: SP has reached over 1.3 million vodcasts, the most downloaded vodcasts of any ABC programme this year. ABC3's Good Game: SP website has recorded 254,000 visits and 1.6 million page views since January." O'Donnell named the "Ask Good Game" segment his "favourite part of the show, reading those letters and making the noises". He added "It's my dream that one day kids might look back on GGSP in the way I look back on shows from my youth, I hope we do it well enough that this might happen."

Bendixsen announced her departure from the show in January 2017; supporting host Gus Ronald and Angharad Yeo took her place. O'Donnell departed from the show in December 2017, and was replaced by Gemma Driscoll in 2018. Ronald departed the show in 2018, replaced by William Yates in 2019. Yates departed in 2020. "Jax" joined the show in February 2022 and departed in December 2022. In November 2022, Yeo announced her departure at the year's end.

Presenters

Main hosts 
 

Notes
 The show has also presented by D.A.R.R.E.N. the Robot since its inception.

Guest hosts 
 Jackson "Ajax" Gothe-Snape (2010)
 Kayne "Tremmers" Tremills (2010) hosted Series 1, Episode 19 (26 June 2010), replacing Bajo as he was at E3 2010.
 Pip Rasmussen (2017) hosted Series 8, Episode 19 (24 June 2017), replacing Rad and Goose as they were at E3 2017. Also guest hosted Series 8, Episode 35 (14 October 2017), to celebrate female developers for International Day of the Girl.
 Tim Mathews (2017) hosted Series 8, Episode 36 (21 October 2017).

Segments

All series
Reviews: Review segments are presented by the host throughout the show. Each time a current game is discussed while footage is shown to the viewers. At the end, a rubber chicken(or star) rating (a number out of 10 [2010-2014] or 5 [2015-now]) is given to the game. Two games are usually reviewed during each show. Some reviews are also replayed from the main show.

Perfect scoring games 
Portal 2 (2011 – Bajo and Hex)
Ori and the Blind Forest (2015 – Bajo and Hex)
The Legend of Zelda: Breath of the Wild (2017 – Bajo and Goose)
Cuphead (2017 – Bajo and Rad)
Super Mario Odyssey (2017 – Rad and Goose)
Ori and the Will of the Wisps  (2020 – Gem and Rad)
Animal Crossing: New Horizons (2020 – Gem and Rad)
Ratchet & Clank: Rift Apart  (2021 – Gem and Rad)
  Tunic (2022 - Gem and Rad)

Ask SP: A main weekly segment where questions are answered from viewers via their website or video form.
Meet the Spawn: This segment meets gamers who discuss their gaming interests.

Individual series

Season 1 (2010)
One Face Review: In this segment, people send in pictures of themselves rating a certain game, series or character using their thumbs and the results are all tallied up with the final verdict being awful, average, or awesome.
Spawn Selects: An online poll on the official website allows viewers to vote for a game or character out of three choices that share the some topic, for example, space, RPG or music, with the highest voted game given the chance to be talked about by the hosts.
GG:SP Dissects: Shows what makes up a game, such as the spawn point or cutscenes.
5-Up: This segment counts down the top five gaming related subjects. Only one of these aired, which was taken from the main show.
Let's Cheat With D.A.R.R.E.N: D.A.R.R.E.N gives out a cheat for a game.

Season 2 (2011)
I'm No Noob: D.A.R.R.E.N sets a challenge for viewers, such as to reach the highest score they can get in a game, and send in a screenshot of it. The best entries are often given prizes.
D.A.R.R.E.N's Dictionary: D.A.R.R.E.N explains the definition of a game related term.
Gamer News: This segment presents gaming news from worldwide.
So You Want to Work in Gaming: The segment takes a look at some people who have turned their passion for gaming into a real life career.
How it Works: Goose visits some experts to find out how game features work.
Feature Stories: Goose takes to the streets for some sleuthing, investigating and interviewing.
Level Up with D.A.R.R.E.N: D.A.R.R.E.N provides helpful tips for a game.

Season 3 (2012)
D.A.R.R.E.N's Data Dump: D.A.R.R.E.N 'dumps' valuable gaming information straight into the minds of Spawnlings. It is similar to D.A.R.R.E.N's dictionary but the information is on a more technical gaming or computer concept rather than a simple in-game term, and isn't restricted to games; such : Amigaas "Hacking" which relates to the hardware side of a computer.
I'm No Noob: D.A.R.R.E.N sets a challenge for viewers, such as to reach the highest score they can get in a game, and send in a screenshot of it. The best entries are often given prizes.
D.A.R.R.E.N.'s Time Warp: D.A.R.R.E.N time travels through time and talks about gaming history.
Video Game Postcards: D.A.R.R.E.N and Goose go to video game locations.

Season 4 (2013)
Gaming Around the World with D.A.R.R.E.N: D.A.R.R.E.N gives the viewers a look at gaming in different countries and explains the country's impact in gaming.
D.A.R.R.E.N Does Devs: D.A.R.R.E.N has a personal interview with a game developer.
This Is Your EXTRA Life: Goose has a deeper look at the history and story behind one of the characters featured in one of the games reviewed.

Season 5 (2014)
D.A.R.R.E.N's Challenge: Similar to the "Name That Game" segment on the original show, D.A.R.R.EN gives the viewer a trivia question about a game. The answers is revealed at the end of the show.
The D.A.R.R.E.N Report: A more detailed version of the "Data Dump" segment, except the topic is to do with one of the games reviewed.

Season 6 (2015)
D.A.R.R.E.N's Challenge: Similar to the "Name That Game" segment on the original show, D.A.R.R.EN gives the viewer a trivia question about a game. The answers is revealed at the end of the show.
D.A.R.R.E.N's Data Dump: D.A.R.R.E.N 'dumps' valuable gaming information straight into the minds of Spawnlings. It is similar to D.A.R.R.E.N's dictionary but the information is on a more technical gaming or computer concept rather than a simple in-game term, and isn't restricted to games; such : Amigaas "Hacking" which relates to the hardware side of a computer.
Coding Corner: Goose and Julian, a young programming prodigy seen in a "Meet the Spawn" segment, as teach viewers coding tips and tricks in the video game coding application Scratch.
Spawn Point League: Bajo and Hex compete in gaming challenges to find out who will earn the title of the 2015 Spawn Point League Champion and reign supreme.

Season 7 (2016)
Goose's Gaming Picks: Goose presents headlines in gaming news worldwide and his gaming picks from viewers.
Strategy Sirs: "General" Goose and "Field Marshall" Darren uncover top notch gaming strategies to help players improve from a mere noob to a most efficient pro.

Notes

External links
 Official website

References

Australian Broadcasting Corporation original programming
Australian children's television series
Australian non-fiction television series
Television shows about video games
Australian television spin-offs
2010 Australian television series debuts